How Democracies Die is a 2018 comparative politics book by Harvard University political scientists Steven Levitsky and Daniel Ziblatt about how elected leaders can gradually subvert the democratic process to increase their power. In 2021, The Economist described the book as the "most important book of the Trump era." The book, which offers stark warnings about the impact of the Republican Party and Donald Trump's presidency on U.S. democracy, influenced Joe Biden prior to his decision to run for president in the 2020 presidential election.

Synopsis 
The book warns against the breakdown of "mutual toleration" and respect for the political legitimacy of the opposition.  This tolerance involves accepting the results of a free and fair election where the opposition has won, in contrast with advocacy for overthrow or spurious complaints about the election mechanism. The authors also assert the importance of respecting the opinions of those who come to legitimately different political opinions, in contrast to attacking the patriotism of any who disagree, or warning that if they come to power they will destroy the country.  

The authors point out that the various branches of government in a system with separation of powers have actions available to them that could completely undermine the other branches or the opposition.  The authors warn against ramming through a political agenda or accumulating power by playing "constitutional hardball" with tactics like court packing, stonewalling nominations, or abusing the power of the purse, and recommend "forbearance" and some degree of cooperation to keep government functioning in a balanced fashion.  Other threats to democratic stability cited by the authors include economic inequality and segregation of the political parties by race, religion, and geography.

The authors dedicate many chapters to the study of the United States, President Donald Trump, and the 2016 presidential election, but also apply their theory to Latin America and European countries, especially Venezuela and Russia. According to them, the United States has, until 2016, resisted the attempts to undermine democracy thanks to two norms: mutual toleration and forbearance, the latter defined as the intentional restraint of one's power in order to respect the spirit of the law if not its letters. They finally predict three potential scenarios for the post-Trump United States.

Analysis 
Steven Levitsky and Daniel Ziblatt, Harvard professors, study the prospect of the democratic system in an holistic approach, and take a critical stand of the Trump presidency. They describe their work as a study of how democracies die. The main subjects are drawn in the introduction: the authors argue that in our time, democracies still die but by different means, "less at the hand of men with guns and more by elected leaders".
The methodology used is mainly based on the "comparative method" and it is a book that tries to "reveal about our future" based on history, more specifically on historical comparisons (finding similar dynamics, presenting  models of  "gatekeeping" and the "rhymes" of history).
The object of the study is the president Trump as an "autocrat in becoming" and, a comparison with state failures and autocrats. The study assesses the risk of his presidency and tries to identify the pattern of autocratic tendencies.

Recommendations of the authors 
Levitsky and Ziblatt accept the fear of the Trump presidency as legitimate and pledge for the protection of the democracy. Particularly the last chapter saving democracy, put emphasis on political recommendations to save democracy in a pledge 

A proposed solution to the crisis 

And they make recommendations for the Republicans 

And also to the Democrats 

In an interview, Levitsky identifies two objectives of the book: One is defeating Trump and the other is shoring up our democracy. Finally, they suggest that the effect of the Trump presidency could be a mild form of  "competitive authoritarianism".

Reviews and awards 
The New York Times called it an essential guide to what can happen in the United States. The Washington Post said the book offers a sober look at the current state of affairs. The Wall Street Journal called it an unintentional clarifying lesson. In the United Kingdom, The Guardian called it provocative but also unsatisfying. The magazine Foreign Affairs concluded it is an important study. Fair Observer called it an original contribution valuable to researchers, policy makers, and citizens. Columbia University historian Adam Tooze described the book as the "most thought-provoking book comparing democratic crises in different nations." Barack Obama listed the book on his "Favorite Books of 2018" list.

In a scholarly review, political theorist Rosolino A. Candela praised the work and concluded that academics will find "much to learn, unpack, and develop".

The book was on The New York Times Bestseller list.

The book was awarded with the German NDR Kultur Sachbuchpreis 2018.

See also

References

Notes

Bibliography
Berman, S. (2018). A Discussion of Steven Levitsky and Daniel Ziblatt’s How Democracies Die. Perspectives on Politics, 16(4), 1092-1094. doi:10.1017/S1537592718002852
Bunce, V. (2018). A Discussion of Steven Levitsky and Daniel Ziblatt's How Democracies Die. Perspectives on Politics, 16(4), 1103–1104. doi:10.1017/S1537592718002839
Connolly, W. (2018). A Discussion of Steven Levitsky and Daniel Ziblatt's How Democracies Die. Perspectives on Politics, 16(4), 1095–1096. doi:10.1017/S1537592718002888
Cramer, K. (2018). A Discussion of Steven Levitsky and Daniel Ziblatt's How Democracies Die. Perspectives on Politics, 16(4), 1097–1098. doi:10.1017/S1537592718002876

 
Parker, C. (2018). A Discussion of Steven Levitsky and Daniel Ziblatt's How Democracies Die. Perspectives on Politics, 16(4), 1099–1100. doi:10.1017/S153759271800289X
Pérez-Liñán, A. (2018). A Discussion of Steven Levitsky and Daniel Ziblatt's How Democracies Die. Perspectives on Politics, 16(4), 1101–1102. doi:10.1017/S1537592718003043

External links 

 How Democracies Die' Authors Say Trump Is A Symptom Of 'Deeper Problems NPR, 22 January 2018
Penguin Publisher Website

2018 non-fiction books
English-language books
American political books
Books about democracy
Political science books
Crown Publishing Group books